La Pourcailhade (also known as La Fete du Cochon or  Festival of the Pig) was a pig festival that was held each year in August in the town of Trie-sur-Baïse, in the Hautes-Pyrénées department of south-western France. It was first held in 1975 and was organised by La Confrérie du Cochon or the Brotherhood of the Pig. The festival involved displays, pig races, eating contests and other competitions. The most popular competition was "Le Championnat de France du Cri de Cochon" ("French Pig-Squealing Championships"), in which contestants had to imitate the noises pigs make at various stages in their life. 

It once featured on the Channel 4 television programme Eurotrash.  The contest achieved international notoriety in 2005 when a photo of one of the contestants Jacques Barrot was doctored and portrayed as an attempt to ridicule the Prophet Mohammed in the Akkari-Laban dossier produced by two imams who had been granted sanctuary in Denmark but were upset by the publication of 12 cartoons related to Mohammed in the Jyllands-Posten newspaper.  The dossier was used as evidence of anti-Muslim feeling in Denmark in several tours of Arab countries by the imams and others in an attempt to inflame passions about the Jyllands-Posten cartoons.

La Pourcailhade was relaunched in August 2018.

References
Piers Letcher, Eccentric France (Bradt, 2003)

Festivals in France
Recurring events established in 1975
Tourist attractions in Hautes-Pyrénées